In home cinema and video editing technology, bias lighting is a weak light source on the backside of a screen or monitor that illuminates the wall or surface behind and just around the display.

Motivation 
The purpose of bias lighting is to reduce the perceived brightness of the display as a result of the contrast with the slightly illuminated area around it. This reduces the eye strain and fatigue that occurs when viewing a bright display against a very dark background for an extended time, and increases the perceived blackness, perceived highlights and overall contrast of the display.

History 
Bias lighting has been used since the early days of television in the form of "TV lamps", often taking the shape of an animal, that were set atop television sets and projected light onto the wall behind the set. As of the 2000s, bias lights often use LEDs, attach to the backside of flat-panel displays, and draw power from a USB port. Some bias lighting kits even use a webcam pointed at a TV or monitor screen to read colors and change television backlights accordingly. They may also be integrated into the display. Some Philips televisions since 2002, for example, feature integrated bias lights with the brand name "Ambilight". Color-changing lights like this should not be used in professional editing environments or where image fidelity is important.

Color temperature 
Bias lights with a color temperature of 6,500 K match the temperature of most monitors' white color, which is derived from the CIE standard illuminant D65. They are used in professional editing environments and are recommended to maximize the fidelity of the perceived image. In home cinema, bias lighting that is no brighter than 10% of the display's brightest spot and with a color rendering index of at least 90 is recommended. There is some debate about the proper brightness levels of bias lighting for HDR content, with SMPTE recommending 4.5 nits and the Imaging Science Foundation recommending 10%, but sometimes as high as 15%.

See also 
 Background light, lighting used to illuminate the background area of a set in theatre and film

References

Film and video technology
Lighting